Neopodocinum is a genus of mites in the family Macrochelidae. There are about six described species in Neopodocinum.

Species
These six species belong to the genus Neopodocinum:
 Neopodocinum caputmedusae (Berlese, 1908)
 Neopodocinum halimunensis Hartini & Takaku, 2003
 Neopodocinum kalimantanense Hartini & Takaku, 2004
 Neopodocinum meridionalis Selin, 1931
 Neopodocinum mrciaki Selinick, 1968
 Neopodocinum subjaspersi Hartini & Takaku, 2003

References

Macrochelidae
Articles created by Qbugbot